Werner Fasslabend (born 5 March 1944) is an Austrian jurist and politician. Fasslabend was Minister of Defense from 1990 until 2000 as well as from 1987 to 1990 and from 2000 to 2007 a member of the National Council. From 2000 to 2002 he served as third president of the National Council.

He is imperial Knight of Honor of the Order of St. George.

References 

Austrian Ministers of Defence
Members of the National Council (Austria)
Knights Grand Cross of the Order of Merit of the Italian Republic
Grand Crosses of the Order of the Crown (Belgium)
Commanders First Class of the Order of the Polar Star
University of Vienna alumni
20th-century Austrian politicians
21st-century Austrian politicians
Austrian People's Party politicians
Living people
1944 births
People from Gänserndorf District